George Martin Long (born 5 November 1993) is an English professional footballer who plays as a goalkeeper for Millwall.

Born in Sheffield, South Yorkshire, he came through the youth ranks at his hometown Sheffield United before making the break into the first team, and has also represented England at Under 18 level. Long has previously had loan spells at Oxford United, Motherwell and AFC Wimbledon.

Club career

Long made his début for the Blades at the beginning of May 2011, starting the last game of the 2010–11 season against Swansea City at the Liberty Stadium, in doing so becoming the youngest goalkeeper to play in a league game for the Blades in the club's history at just 17 years 183 days. Long was a member of the team that reached the final of the FA Youth Cup in 2011, only to lose to Manchester United. After a couple more first-team appearances he was handed a new long-term deal in February 2012 to keep him at Bramall Lane until the summer of 2016.

Long started the following season as second choice behind Mark Howard but, after an injury to Howard in October 2012, became the side's regular stopper. During his initial run in the team he conceded only one goal in 5 league appearances and was subsequently awarded League One 'Player of the Month' for October, followed by the Blades supporters' Player of the Month for November 2012. Long retained his place in the first team, despite the signing of experienced former Welsh international keeper Danny Coyne, and in March 2013 he was named Football League Young Player of the Month for February, following six consecutive clean sheets over the period. Long remained United's first-choice keeper and finished the season having played 44 times in all competitions.

On 25 July 2014, Long joined Oxford United on a six-month loan deal to play first-team football having dropped to second-choice keeper at Bramall Lane behind Mark Howard. In November, Blades manager Nigel Clough recalled Long from his loan spell after Oxford manager Michael Appleton revealed that Long was no longer part of his plans and had been dropped from the first team to make way for further loan signings.

On 2 February 2015, Long signed for Scottish Premiership club Motherwell on loan until the end of the 2014–15 season. Long helped Motherwell preserve their top flight status with a 6–1 aggregate win over Rangers in the Scottish Premiership playoff Final.

After returning to Sheffield United, Long started the 2015–16 season as first choice keeper after impressing new manager Nigel Adkins. However, after a disappointing loss to Gillingham in the first match of the season, Long was replaced by Mark Howard. Long was still used in cup matches and performed well saving two out of five penalties in a shoot out against Hartlepool United in the Football League Trophy. Long returned to first choice in November 2015 against Southend United. Some good performances led to him twice being named in the Sky Bet Football League Team of the week in December 2015. On 6 February 2016 the goalkeeper made his 100th starting appearance for Sheffield United in a League 1 game against Wigan Athletic. United lost 0–2, though he did save a penalty in the game. On 9 June 2016 Long signed a two-year contract (with a club option for a third year) under new manager Chris Wilder.

On 4 July 2017, he joined AFC Wimbledon on a one-season loan. He was transfer-listed by Sheffield United at the end of the 2017–18 season after the club had triggered his contract option year for the season 2018–19.

On 18 July 2018, Long joined fellow EFL Championship club Hull City on a three-year contract. He made his Hull debut on 28 August 2018 in the Second round of the EFL Cup at home to Derby County which Hull lost 0–4.

On 25 May 2021, it was announced that Long had opted not to sign a new contract with Hull City and instead signed for Millwall on a free transfer.

International career
Long made his England U18 début in April 2011, coming on as a second-half substitute during a 1–1 draw with Italy in Carpi. Following a successful 2012–13 season, Long was selected in the provisional 35-man squad for the 2013 FIFA Under 20 World Cup, and was later confirmed as part of the 21-man squad for the finals themselves. Long featured in a pre-tournament practice match against Uruguay, but failed to make any competitive appearances during the tournament. On 8 August 2013 Long got his first call up to the England U21 team for the match against Scotland U21s on 13 August at Sheffield United's Bramall Lane. Upon his first call up to the U21s Long stated "It makes it a bit more special that it's at Bramall Lane. There will be a great atmosphere there and a packed stadium, so I'm looking forward to it." On 27 August 2013 Long was called up for the England U21s again under new boss Gareth Southgate for matches against Moldova U21s and Finland U21s for Group 1 2015 U-21 Euro Qualifier matches and once more in November for matches against San Marino U21s and Finland's U21s again.

Career statistics

Honours

Hull City
EFL League One Champions: 2020–21

Individual
Football League One Player of the Month: October 2012
Football League Young Player of the Month: February 2013

References

External links

Club profile at Sheffield United F.C.
England profile  at The FA

1993 births
Living people
Footballers from Sheffield
English footballers
England youth international footballers
Association football goalkeepers
Sheffield United F.C. players
Oxford United F.C. players
Motherwell F.C. players
Hull City A.F.C. players
Millwall F.C. players
English Football League players
Scottish Professional Football League players